The Geography of Guyana comprises the physical characteristics of the country in Northern South America and part of Caribbean South America, bordering the North Atlantic Ocean, between Suriname and Venezuela, with a land area of approximately 214,969 square km. The country is situated between 1 and 9 north latitude and between 56 and 62 west longitude. With a -long Atlantic coastline on the northeast, Guyana is bounded by Venezuela on the west, Brazil on the west and south, and Suriname on the east.

Geographic regions
The land comprises three main geographical zones: the coastal plain, the white sand belt and the interior highlands.

The coastal plain, which occupies about 5 percent of the country's area, is home to more than 90 percent of its inhabitants. The plain ranges from five to six kilometers wide and extends from the Corentyne River in the east to the Venezuelan border in the northwest.

The coastal plain is made up largely of alluvial mud swept out to sea by the Amazon River, carried north by ocean currents, and deposited on the Guyanese shores. A rich clay of great fertility, this mud overlays the white sands and clays formed from the erosion of the interior bedrock and carried seaward by the rivers of Guyana. Because much of the coastal plain floods at high tide, efforts to dam and drain this area have gone on since the 18th century. A recent global remote sensing analysis suggested that there were 1,178km² of tidal flats in Guyana, making it the 30th ranked country in terms of tidal flat area.

Guyana has no well-defined shoreline or sandy beaches. Approaching the ocean, the land gradually loses elevation until it includes many areas of marsh and swamp. Seaward from the vegetation line is a region of mud flats, shallow brown water, and sandbars. Off New Amsterdam, these mud flats extend almost . The sandbars and shallow water are a major impediment to shipping, and incoming vessels must partially unload their cargoes offshore in order to reach the docks at Georgetown and New Amsterdam.

A line of swamps forms a barrier between the white sandy hills of the interior and the coastal plain. These swamps, formed when water was prevented from flowing onto coastal croplands by a series of dams, serve as reservoirs during periods of drought.

The white sand belt lies south of the coastal zone. This area is 150 to 250 kilometers wide and consists of low sandy hills interspersed with rocky outcroppings. The white sands support a dense hardwood forest. These sands cannot support crops, and if the trees are removed erosion is rapid and severe. Most of Guyana's reserves of bauxite, gold, and diamonds are found in this region.

The largest of Guyana's three geographical regions is the interior highlands, a series of plateaus, flat-topped mountains, and savannahs that extend from the white sand belt to the country's southern borders. The Pacaraima Mountains dominate the western part of the interior highlands. In this region are found some of the oldest sedimentary rocks in the Western Hemisphere. Mount Roraima, on the Venezuelan border, is part of the Pakaraima range and, at 2,762 meters, is Guyana's tallest peak. Farther south lies the Kaieteur Plateau, a broad, rocky area about 600 meters in elevation; the 1,000-meter high Kanuku Mountains; and the low Acarai Mountains situated on the southern border with Brazil.

Much of the interior highlands consist of grassland. The largest expanse of grassland, the Rupununi Savannah, covers about 15,000 square kilometers in southern Guyana. This savannah also extends far into Venezuela and Brazil. The part in Guyana is split into northern and southern regions by the Kanuku Mountains. The sparse grasses of the savannah in general support only grazing, although Amerindian groups cultivate a few areas along the Rupununi River and in the foothills of the Kanuku Mountains.

Hydrology

Guyana is a water-rich country. Numerous rivers flow into the Atlantic Ocean, generally in a northward direction. A number of rivers in the western part of the country, however, flow eastward into the Essequibo River, draining the Kaieteur Plateau. The Essequibo, the country's major river, runs from the Brazilian border in the south to a wide delta west of Georgetown. The rivers of eastern Guyana cut across the coastal zone, making east-west travel difficult, but they also provide limited water access to the interior.

Waterfalls generally limit water transport to the lower reaches of each river. Some of the waterfalls are spectacular; for example, Kaieteur Falls on the Potaro River drops 226 metres. Other enormous waterfalls are King Edward VIII Falls (256 m), Kumerau Falls (190 m), Oshi Falls (160 – 210 m). In the country are known to exist more than 200 rapids and more than 70 large waterfalls. Many waterfalls are little known and most are not measured yet, it is possible that there are waterfalls in excess of 300 m tall.

Drainage throughout most of Guyana is poor and river flow sluggish because the average gradient of the main rivers is only one meter every five kilometers. Swamps and areas of periodic flooding are found in all but the mountainous regions, and all new land projects require extensive drainage networks before they are suitable for agricultural use. The average square kilometer on a sugar plantation, for example, has six kilometers of irrigation canals, eighteen kilometers of large drains, and eighteen kilometers of small drains. These canals occupy nearly one-eighth of the surface area of the average sugarcane field. Some of the larger estates have more than 550 kilometers of canals; Guyana itself has a total of more than 8,000 kilometers. Even Georgetown is below sea level and must depend on dikes for protection from the Demerara River and the Atlantic Ocean.

Climate

Lying near the equator, Guyana has a tropical climate, and temperatures do not vary much throughout the year. The year has two wet seasons, from December to early February and from late April to mid-August.

Although the temperature never gets dangerously high, the combination of heat and humidity can at times seem oppressive. The entire area is under the influence of the northeast trade winds, and during the midday and afternoon sea breezes bring relief to the coast. Guyana lies south of the path of Caribbean hurricanes and none is known to have hit the country.

Humidity averages 70 percent year-round. Locations in the interior, away from the moderating influence of the ocean, experience slightly wider variations in daily temperature, and nighttime readings as low as  have been recorded. Humidity in the interior is also slightly lower, averaging around 60 percent.

Rainfall is heaviest in the northwest and lightest in the southeast and interior. Although rain falls throughout the year, about 50 percent of the annual total arrives in the summer rainy season that extends from May to the end of July along the coast and from April through September farther inland. Coastal areas have a second rainy season from November through January. Rain generally falls in heavy afternoon showers or thunderstorms. Overcast days are rare; most days include four to eight hours of sunshine from morning through early afternoon.

Characteristics
Geographic coordinates:

Area
Total: 214,969 km²
Land: 196,849 km²
Water: 18,120 km²

Land boundaries
Total: 2,933 km
Border countries: Brazil 1,308 km, Suriname 836 km, Venezuela 789 km

Coastline

Maritime claims
Territorial sea: 
Exclusive economic zone:  and 
Continental shelf:  or to the outer edge of the continental margin

Terrain
Mostly rolling highlands; low coastal plain; savanna in south.

Elevation extremes
Lowest point: Atlantic Coast, -1 m
Highest point: Mount Roraima, 2,835 m

Natural resources
Bauxite, gold, diamonds, hardwood timber, shrimp, fish.

Land use
Arable land: 2.13%
Permanent crops: 0.14%
Other: 97.72%

Irrigated land
1,501 km² (2003)

Total renewable water resources
241 km3 (2011)

Freshwater withdrawal (domestic/industrial/agricultural)
Total: 1.64 km3/yr *4%/1%/94%)
Per capita: 2,222 m3/yr (2010)

Natural hazards
Flash floods are a constant threat during rainy seasons
Hurricanes are becoming a threat during summertime

Environment, current issues
Water pollution from sewage and agricultural and industrial chemicals; deforestation

Environment - international agreements
Party to: Biodiversity, Climate Change, Desertification, Endangered Species, Hazardous Wastes, Law of the Sea, Ozone Layer Protection, Ship Pollution, Tropical Timber 83, Tropical Timber 94

Extreme points 

 Northernmost point – Waini Peninsula, Barima-Waini Region
 Southernmost point – border with Brazil near Wai-Wai, Upper Takutu-Upper Essequibo Region
 Westernmost point – Mount Venamo, border with Venezuela, Cuyuni-Mazaruni Region
 Easternmost point – border with Suriname and Brazil, East Berbice-Corentyne Region
 Highest point – Mount Roraima: 2,835 m
 Lowest point – Atlantic Coast: 0 m
Its western most point is disputed with Venezuela.

See also
 List of cities in Guyana
:Category:Rivers of Guyana
:Category:Waterfalls of Guyana.

References